Svantesson may refer to:

Svante Svantesson Banér (1624–1674), Swedish noble
Sten Svantesson Bielke (1598–1638), statesman of the Swedish Empire
Nils Svantesson Sture (born 1543), Swedish diplomat and soldier during the reign of Erik XIV of Sweden
Elisabeth Svantesson (born 1967), Swedish politician of the Moderate Party
Ian Svantesson (born 1993), American soccer player
Jan-Olof Svantesson (born 1944), professor of Linguistics at Lund University, Sweden
Johan Svantesson (born 1992), Swedish footballer
Lars Svantesson (born 1933), Swedish former freestyle swimmer
Tobias Svantesson (born 1963), former professional tennis player from Sweden

See also
Santesson
Svendsen